Notocyrtus is a genus of true bugs belonging to the family Reduviidae.

The species of this genus are found in Central and Southern America.

Species:

Notocyrtus acanganus 
Notocyrtus amapaensis 
Notocyrtus bactrianus

References

Reduviidae